The Mejlbystenen, also known as runic inscription DR 117 from its Rundata catalog listing, is an approximately 1,000-year-old runestone originally located at Mejlby, near Randers in Denmark. According to a new interactive exhibit of the stone at the Randers Kulturhistoriske Museum, which differs slightly from the accepted Rundata translation, the stone reads:

The inscription has been classified as being carved in runestone style RAK.

Inscription

Transliteration of the runes into Latin characters
oni : risþ : stin : þansi : aft : o¶skl : sun : sin : ias : tauþr ¶ uarþ : maþ : þuri : i : ura:¶:suti :

Transcription into Old Norse
Áni reisti stein þenna ept Áskel, son sinn, er dauðr varð með Þóri í Eyrasundi.

Translation in English
Áni raised this stone in memory of Áskell, his son, who died with Þórir in The Sound.

References

External links
Photograph of runestone

Runestones in Denmark